The 2015–16 Biathlon World Cup – World Cup 6 was held in Rasen-Antholz, Italy, from 21 January until 24 January 2016.

Schedule of events

Medal winners

Men

Women

References 

6
2016 in Italian sport
January 2016 sports events in Europe
World Cup - World Cup 6,2015-16